Dolly Dimples can have several meanings:

 Dolly Dimples (comic strip), former syndicated newspaper comic strip character created by Grace Drayton
 Dolly Dimples (Utah), 1909 publicity stunt in Salt Lake City
 "Dolly Dimples", traditional name for large ladies who once made their living with freak shows at circuses and carnivals
 "Dolly Dimples", stage name of performer Celesta Geyer (née Herrmann)
 "Dolly Dimple's" is a Norwegian restaurant chain started in 1986